Blair Aldridge Ruble (born December 18, 1949) is a non-fiction writer and academic administrator whose work has focused on comparative urban studies as well as Russian and Ukrainian affairs.

Early life and education

A native of Beacon, New York, Ruble grew up in Dobbs Ferry, New York, where he attended public schools.

Career

He served as Director of the Woodrow Wilson International Center for Scholars' Kennan Institute (1989-2012) and has held a number of other positions at the Wilson Center (1977-1982, 1989-2017) including Vice President for Programs (2013-2017). He also served as Staff Associate at the Social Science Research Council (1985-1989) and Assistant Executive Director of the National Council for Soviet and East European Research (1982-1985).

Ruble graduated from the University of North Carolina at Chapel Hill with Highest Honors in Political Science (1971), and received his MA (1973) and PhD (1977) in Political Science from the University of Toronto. He also attended Leningrad State University Juridical Faculty (1974-1975). He is the recipient of an Honorary Doctorate (2012) from the Modern Art Research Institute of the National Academy of Arts of Ukraine in Kyiv.

He has taught at George Washington University (1983), the University of Paris X, Laboratorie de Geographie Urbaine, Nanterre (2001 and 2002), and Università della Svizzera italiana - Accademia di Architettura di Mendrisio, Switzerland (2006) and has lectured internationally. His works have been translated into Chinese, French, Japanese, Russian, Spanish, and Ukrainian.

Ruble has published in the opinion pages of Newsweek, The Asian Wall Street Journal, The Atlanta Constitution, The Baltimore Sun, The New York Times, The Washington Post, The Washington Afro-American, and USA Today.  His media appearances include ABC News, BBC News International, CBC News: Morning, CBS Evening News, NBC's The Today Show, The Kojo Nnamdi Show, The Charlie Rose (TV series), Russian NTV Russia News Magazine Itogi, Japanese NHK Morning News, France 24 on television, as well as The Larry King Show Radio, and several Voice of America broadcasts.

Ruble is the author of "The Arts of War: Ukrainian Artists Confront Russia" blog on the Woodrow Wilson Center's "Kennan Institute Ukraine Focus" website .

In 2005, Ruble was among the speakers at the memorial service for George F. Kennan held at the Washington National Cathedral.

Personal life

Ruble and his wife, Sally, live in Washington, DC.

Books
Performing Presence from the Washington Stage (New Academia Publishers, 2021).

The Muse of Urban Delirium: How the Performing Arts Paradoxically Transform Conflict-Ridden Cities into Centers of Cultural Innovation (New Academia Publishers 2017).

Performing Community I-IV: Short Essays on Community, Diversity, Inclusion, and the Performing Arts (Woodrow Wilson Center, 2016-2020).

Washington's U Street: A Biography (Woodrow Wilson Center Press & Johns Hopkins Press 2010).

Creating Diversity Capital: Transnational Migrants in Montreal, Washington, and Kyiv (Woodrow Wilson Press & Johns Hopkins Press 2005).

Second Metropolis. Pragmatic Pluralism in Gilded Age Chicago, Silver Age Moscow, and Meiji Japan. (Woodrow Wilson Press & Johns Hopkins Press 2001).

Money Sings: The Changing Politics of Urban Space in Post-Soviet Yaroslav (Woodrow Wilson Press and Cambridge University Press 2006).

Leningrad: Shaping a Soviet City (University of California Press 1990).

Soviet Trade Unions: Their Development in the 1970s (1981).

Edited volumes

D.C. Jazz: Historical Portraits of Jazz Music from Washington, DC (edited with Maurice Jackson) (2018)

Urban Diversity: Space, Culture and Inclusive Pluralism in Cities Worldwide (edited with Caroline Wanjiku Kihato, Mejgan Massoumi, Pep Subiros, and Allison Garland) (2010)

Cities after the Fall of Communism: Reshaping Cultural Landscapes and European Identity (edited with John Czaplicka and Nida Gelazis) (2009)

Migration, Homeland and Belonging in Eurasia (edited with Cynthia Buckley with Erin Hoffmann) (2008)

Place, Identity and Urban Culture: Odesa and New Orleans (edited with Samuel C. Ramer) (2008)

Integration in Urban Communities. Renegotiating the City (edited with Lisa M. Hanley and Allison Garland) (2008)

Global Urban Poverty. Setting the Agenda (edited with Allison M. Garland and Mejgan Massouri) (2007)

200 let rossiisko-amerikanskikh otnoshenii: naula i obrazovanie. Sbornik statei (edited with Alexander O. Chubarian) (2007)

Rebounding Identities. The Politics of Identity in the Russian Federation and Ukraine (edited with Dominique Arel) (2005)

Russia's Engagement with the West: Transformation and Integration in the Twenty-First Century (edited with Alexander J. Motyl, and Lilia Shevtsova) (2005)

Moskva rubezha XIX i XX stoletii. Vzgliad v proshloe izdaleka (edited with Pavel Ilyin 2004).

Netradytsiini immihranti u Kievi (edited with Olena Brachevskaya, Glina Volosiuk, Olena Malynovs'ka, Yaroslav Pilynsky, and Nancy Popson,) (2003)

Composing Urban History and the Constitution of Civic Identities (edited with John J. Czaplicka with the assistance of Lauren Crabtree) (2003).

Fragmented Space in the Russian Federation (edited with Jodi Koehn and Nancy E. Popson) (2002).

Preparing for the Urban Future: Global Pressures and Local Forces (edited with Michael A. Cohen, Joseph S. Tulchin, and Allison M. Garland) (1996)

Russian Housing in the Modern Age: Design and Social History (edited with William Craft Brumfield) (1993)

A Scholar's Guide to Humanities and Social Sciences in the Soviet Successor States: The Academies of Sciences of Russia, Armenia, Azerbaidzhan, Belarus, Estonia, Georgia, Kazakhstan, Latvia, Lithuania, Moldova, Tadzhikistan, Turkmenistan, Ukraine, and Uzbekistan, Second Edition (edited with Mark H. Teeter, Robert Mdivani, Viktor Pliushchev, Blair A. Ruble, Lev Skvortsov, Wesley Fisher)(1986)

Trade Unions in Communist States (edited with Alex  Pravda) (1986)

A Scholar's Guide to Humanities and Social Sciences in the Soviet Union: Academy of Sciences of the USSR and the Academies of Sciences of the Union Republics (edited with Blair A. Ruble and Mark Teeter, compiled by Robert Mdivani, Viktor Pliushchev and Vadim Milshtein with the assistance of Viktor Cherviakov and Valerii Osinov) (1985).

Industrial Labor in the USSR (edited With Arcadius Kahan) (1979)

References

External links
Museum Symposium Sparks Dialogue On Black Immigrants In D.C.
Blair Ruble: Looking At Russian Cities With An Eye To The Arts, Interview With John Freedman
10 Steps To A More Genuine D. C. Experience
Eighty Years On, What Exactly Is Porgy and Bess

1948 births
Living people
People from Beacon, New York
People from Dobbs Ferry, New York
University of North Carolina at Chapel Hill alumni
Saint Petersburg State University alumni
University of Toronto alumni
George Washington University faculty
Academic staff of the University of Paris